Duchess Maria may refer to:

 Duchess Maria Christina of Teschen (1742–1798), Archduchess of Austria
 Duchess Maria Dorothea of Württemberg (1797–1855), daughter of Duke Louis of Württemberg and Princess Henriette of Nassau-Weilburg
 Duchess Maria Josepha of Bavaria (1857–1943), Infanta of Portugal
 Duchess Maria Nikolaievna of Leuchtenberg (1819–1876), President of the Imperial Academy of Arts
 Duchess Maria of Gloucester and Edinburgh (1736–1807), member of the British Royal Family
 Duchess Maria Sophie of Bavaria (1841–1925), last Queen consort of the Kingdom of the Two Sicilies

See also

 Archduchess Maria (disambiguation)
 Duchess Marie (disambiguation)
 Duchess Mary (disambiguation)
 Grand Duchess Maria (disambiguation)